Will You Marry Me? is a Hindi romantic comedy starring Shreyas Talpade, Rajeev Khandelwal, Tripta Parashar, Mugdha Godse, Celina Jaitly and Muzammil Ibrahim in lead roles. The film is about a beach wedding. It was shot in several locations including Fujairah and Dubai, in the United Arab Emirates, Mumbai, India and Bangkok, Thailand. The film is a copy of the Hollywood movie Tomcats.

Plot
The film is about three bachelors Aarav (Shreyas Talpade), Nikhil (Muzammil Ibrahim) and Rajveer (Rajeev Khandelwal) who along with eleven other college mates sign a contract which has two clauses. The first clause says that all of them have to purchase certain number of Reliance shares, and the second rule explains all the shares will go to the man who will remain unmarried till the end. Slowly and steadily people start to break away from the rule and only Nikhil, Rajveer and Aarav remain single. Nikhil is in love with his childhood friend Anjali (Tripta Prashar) and wants to settle down with her but the other two have no such plans, but they find the proceedings interesting after discovering Anjali's best friend Sneha (Mugdha Godse) at the wedding. Suddenly all their plans to remain unmarried till the end vanish and the two start trying to win Sneha's heart. Meanwhile, one of Rajveer's friends gives him Rs 50 million to keep but Rajveer being smart enough invests the money in the stock market, only to find that the company he invested in has crashed and a powerful business magnate (Paresh Rawal) is after him. Rajveer plans to convince Aarav to marry Sneha so that he can get all the Reliance shares and pay his due. His plans fail when Aarav manages to listen in on a secret conversation.

Cast
Rajeev Khandelwal as Rajveer Sanghi
Mugdha Godse as Sneha Sharma
Shreyas Talpade as Aarav Birla
 Muzammil Ibrahim as Nikhil Ahuja
Manoj Joshi as Anjali's father
Tripta Parashar as Anjali
Celina Jaitly as Vaishali (special appearance)
Paresh Rawal as Gutka King (Sneha's father)

Production
The crew shot in the United Arab Emirates from 26 May – 14 June 2010, according to Mugdha Godse's Twitter. The crew then shot in Mumbai. Filming was completed in Bangkok, Thailand from 24 July – 2 August 2010. "Sixty per cent of the film's story is set in the UAE", says director Aditya Datt. The promotional song "Soniye" choreographed by Jeet Singh.

Soundtrack
The album features 6 tracks composed by Toshi-Sharib, Gaurav Dagaonkar and Sachin Gupta.

Track listings

Reception
The movie released to mostly negative reviews. RediffMovies gave 2 out of 5 star rating with the comment "'Will You Marry Me?' fails to impress". Times Of India gave 1.5 out of 5. The movie was declared disaster in first week of its release with total net gross of first week only Rs. 41 lac.

References

External links
 

Films shot in Dubai
Films shot in Bangkok
Films shot in the United Arab Emirates
2012 films
2010s Hindi-language films
Indian drama films
Films shot in Mumbai
Indian remakes of American films
2012 drama films